If It's Love may refer to:
 "If It's Love" (Squeeze song), 1989
 "If It's Love" (Daniel Schuhmacher song), 2009
 "If It's Love" (Train song), 2010
 "If It's Love", a song by Sting from his album The Bridge, 2021